(literally "Rösti ditch" or "Rösti trench" also transcribed  in order to reflect the Swiss German pronunciation ) is a term used to refer to the cultural boundary between German-speaking and French-speaking parts of Switzerland, the latter known in French as the . There is also the term  which refers to the boundary between German-speaking cantons and the Italian-speaking canton of Ticino.

The term first appeared during World War I, when neutral Switzerland stood between the warring German Empire and the French Republic.

Etymology
The first part of the term is derived from the Swiss German name for hashed potatoes, which originated in the canton of Bern and is considered typical of Swiss German cuisine.

Graben has both the concrete and abstract meaning of "rift", with the Saane/Sarine river valley in the bilingual canton of Fribourg separating the linguistic areas. The Swiss-French use a similar expression: barrière de rös(ch)ti, literally "rösti barrier", or rideau de rös(ch)ti "rösti curtain" (reminiscent of the Iron Curtain). Just like  it has become a familiar facetious expression used whenever differences arise, e.g. different voting results.

Definition

Geographically the line stretches from the Jura Mountains (canton of Jura and Bernese Jura) in the north along Lake Biel, Lake Neuchâtel and Lake Morat through the Swiss Plateau, then crosses the Swiss Alps and the Rhone valley, separating Lower and Upper Valais, and finally reaches the Italian border between the municipalities of Evolène and Zermatt. Folklorists lay emphasis on the importance of the parallel Brünig-Napf-Reuss line further in the east, separating the historic Alemannic (East) and Burgundian (West) spheres of influence.

In social and foreign policy, the Romands tend to favour government regulation (influenced by the centralistic political mentality prevailing in France) and an active foreign policy (somewhat discarding Switzerland's neutrality), especially in relation to the European Union. 
In transportation, environmental protection, and drug control, the difference is not as marked.

In recent years, however, the differences in politics seem to be weakening as the urban areas of German-speaking Switzerland vote similarly to French-speaking Western Switzerland, predominantly in Northwestern Switzerland.

By analogy, the term  is used to refer to cultural and political differences between Italian-speaking Ticino and German-speaking Switzerland. The canton of Ticino is seen as strongly supportive of traditional social values, largely because of its cultural and geographical isolation from the rest of the country. Concerning affairs of foreign policy, the Swiss Italian-speaking population usually votes along with the German Switzerland citizens.

See also
Languages of Switzerland
Culture of Switzerland
 Barassi Line

Notes

Further reading 
Büchi Christophe: . Buchverlag NZZ. Zürich, 2001. .

Cultural boundaries
Society of Switzerland
Politics of Switzerland
Regions of Europe